Polytron may refer to:
 Polytron (electronics company), an electronics company based in Indonesia
 Polytron Corporation, an indie game company
 Polytron (software company), a defunct software company based in the United States

See also